The Stade Municipal Georges Lefèvre is a sports complex located on Président-Kennedy avenue in the forest of Saint-Germain-en-Laye, just across the street from Camp des Loges, the training centre of French football club Paris Saint-Germain.

Development

The complex's main stadium, with a seating capacity of 2,164 spectators, was one of PSG's main grounds until 1974. That year the club moved into the Parc des Princes. The stadium — as well as the other artificial turf and grass football pitches of the complex — hosts training sessions and home matches for the club's male and female academy sides.

In 2023, the club's male football team and academy will move to the Paris Saint-Germain Training Center, which will be located in nearby Poissy. It will have its own stadium, which will complement the Parc des Princes. With a total capacity of 5,000, including over 3,000 seats, the arena will host matches for PSG's youth and female sides in official competitions.

PSG, however, will remain closely linked to its historic birthplace in Saint-Germain-en-Laye as Camp des Loges will become the training ground of the female football team and academy. As a result, Stade Municipal Georges Lefèvre will continue to host training sessions and home matches for the club's female academy sides.

Complex

The Stade Municipal Georges Lefèvre has facilities for athletics, football, hockey, tennis, archery, beach rugby, beach ultimate, beach volleyball, and beach soccer spread over 12 hectares. Additionally, the complex has three stands for football, rugby and hockey; one club-house with a restaurant; changing rooms with bathrooms; and lighting to train and play at night.

Facilities

 Three artificial turf football pitches.
 Two grass football pitches.
 One grass pitch for goalkeeper training.
 One rugby pitch.
 One hybrid grass hockey pitch.
 One 400m athletic track.
 Three weight-throwing areas.
 16 outdoor tennis courts.
 Four indoor tennis courts.
 One double-sided tennis court.
 One mini tennis court.
 One court for beach sports.
 One archery area.

See also

 Parc des Princes
 Camp des Loges
 Paris Saint-Germain Training Center

References

External links

Official websites
PSG.FR - Site officiel du Paris Saint-Germain
Paris Saint-Germain - Ligue 1
Paris Saint-Germain - UEFA.com

Paris Saint-Germain F.C.
Football venues in France
Rugby union stadiums in France
Multi-purpose stadiums in France
Sports venues in Yvelines